Death by Dialogue is a 1988 horror film co-written and directed by Thomas Dewier and distributed by Troma Entertainment.

Plot
The plot centers on a group of college students who go up to a typically creepy mansion for spring break. Unfortunately for all, they stumble upon a possessed horror novel, whose story suddenly starts happening in the real world...with deadly results.

External links

1988 films
1988 horror films
American independent films
Troma Entertainment films
1980s English-language films
1980s American films